The Hohhot Pumped Storage Power Station, also known by Huhehaote, is located  north of Hohhot in Inner Mongolia, China. It uses the pumped-storage hydroelectric method to generate electricity. Construction began in 2005 and the first generator was commissioned on 20 November 2014. The second generator was commissioned on 26 December 2014 and the final two were commissioned in June 2015.

Design and operation
When energy demand is high, water from the upper reservoir supplies the power station with four 306 MW reversible Francis pump turbine-generators to generate electricity. After the power is generated, the water is discharged into a lower reservoir in the valley. When energy demand is low and the upper reservoir needs to be replenished, the water can be pumped back up when the pump-generators reverse into pumps. The lower reservoir is formed by two gravity dams constructed of roller-compacted concrete. It is estimated that the plant will generate 2.007 billion kWh annually but consume 2.677 billion kWh pumping. Because pumping occurs during periods of low energy demand when there is a surplus and electricity is cheap, the plant is economical.

See also

List of pumped-storage hydroelectric power stations

References

Hydroelectric power stations in Inner Mongolia
Dams in China
Pumped-storage hydroelectric power stations in China
Concrete-face rock-fill dams
Hohhot
Dams completed in 2014
2014 establishments in China